Madame was established in the early 1980s, based in Gurugram, Haryana. There are over 800 employees. The brand is targeted at teenage and younger women.

The parent company of Madame is Jain Amar Clothing Pvt.Ltd. There are currently 3 brands under Jain Amar Clothing Pvt.Ltd Madame, M Secret and Camla Barcelona. Jain Amar Clothing has 5 directors Sunil Kumar Jain, Bipan Jain, Akhil Jain, Vibhav Jain and Ashish Jain. And one Chair Man K.L Duggar Jain

Retail 
The brand has undergone notable expansion, opening its first exclusive store in Mumbai in 2002. There were 58 exclusive stores in 42 cities in 2009. There were 64 exclusive stores in 2010, and also 600 multi-brand outlets. In 2014, there were 102 exclusive stores across India and also four stores in Saudi Arabia.

References 

Clothing brands of India
Clothing companies of India